Job's Daughters International is a Masonic affiliated youth organization for girls and young women aged 10 to 20. The organization is commonly referred to as simply Job's Daughters or Jobies, and sometimes abbreviated as JDI (or IOJD, referring to its longtime former name, International Order of Job's Daughters). Job's Daughters welcomes many religions and cultures. The only religious prerequisite is a belief in a Supreme being.

Family relationship to a Free and Accepted Mason is no longer a prerequisite for membership.

JDI promotes itself as a sorority "where girls rule," but there is plenty of adult guidance and interaction.

Membership  
In order to apply for membership in Job's Daughters, one must be a girl between the ages of 10 and 20. To join this organization, an applicant may be either related to a Master Mason or be sponsored by a Majority Member of Job's Daughters and a Master Mason. 

Members are not required to practice any particular religion, but they must believe in a Supreme Being.

If a daughter reaches the age of 20 or marries, and is in good standing in the Bethel, she is considered a majority member. Majority members are encouraged to remain active in their respective Bethel as adult leaders. At age 18, they also are eligible to join the Order of Eastern Star, Order of the Amaranth, The Daughters of the Nile, or Ladies' Oriental Shrine of North America.

History 
The organization was founded as The Order of Job's Daughters by Ethel T. Wead Mick in Omaha, Nebraska, on October 20, 1920.
  The purpose of the organization is to band together young girls and strives to build character through moral and spiritual development. Goals include a greater reverence for God and the Holy Scriptures, as stated in the Job's Daughters Constitution, loyalty to one's country and that country's flag; and respect for parents, guardians, and elderly.

"Mother Mick" was fond of the Book of Job, and took the name of the organization as a reference to the three daughters of Job. The Book of Job, 42nd chapter, 15th verse says, "In all the land were no women found so fair as the Daughters of Job, and their father gave them inheritance among their brethren". She founded the Order with the assistance of her husband, Dr. William H. Mick, and several Freemasons and members of Eastern Star of Nebraska. She dedicated the organization to the memory of her mother, Elizabeth D. Wead.

By June 1923 the Job's Daughters had been endorsed by the Grand Chapters of the Order of the Eastern Star in Indiana, Maryland, Minnesota and Washington, DC. The order spread rapidly in the early 1920s. At the third annual meeting of the "Supreme Guardian Council" in Chicago on Oct. 12, 1923, delegates were present from twenty-three states, the Territory of Alaska and Manitoba.

In 1931 the name was changed to the International Order of Job's Daughters after a Bethel was instituted in Vancouver, British Columbia.

Later, the name was changed from the International Order of Job's Daughters to Job's Daughters International.

The ritual of the Order was drawn up by Le Roy T. Wilcox, a scholar of Masonic law, and the group came "under the general management of the Masonic order".

Levels of Jurisdiction 
 The individual chapter is called a Bethel (as is the meeting location), and each is numbered sequentially according to when they were instituted in their jurisdiction. They usually meet at a Masonic Lodge building, but may meet at a church hall, or other fraternal hall. A Bethel is similar to a troop in Girl or Boy Scouts.
 The next highest level is the Grand level. This comprises all the Bethels in their respective states (or country in the cases of the Philippines and Brazil). This level has an annual convention located somewhere in that jurisdiction, called Grand Bethel, and lasts a few days each time. Jurisdictions that do not have a Grand level and are directly under Supreme law do not have a Grand Bethel.
 The highest level in the Order is the Supreme level. This is similar to the Grand level, except on an international scale.
Each level above the local Bethel has a different philanthropic project. The Supreme project is the H.I.K.E Fund, or Hearing Improvement Kids Endowment Foundation. The Grand jurisdiction varies by area, and typically changes every year.

Today, Bethels and Grand Bethels are active in Australia, Brazil, Canada, the Philippines and the United States. Within the United States, there are currently Bethels in 31 states.  Most states and provinces have a Grand Guardian Council but a few are under the direct supervision of the Supreme Guardian Council.

Bethel Overview 
The presiding officer of the Bethel is the Honored Queen or in Canada & Australia "Honoured Queen" and in Brazil "Honorável Rainha", elected by the members of her Bethel. This position is roughly analogous to Worshipful Master in a Masonic Lodge, and to the President of an association of any kind. The Honored Queen is assisted in her duties by a Senior Princess and a Junior Princess. The Senior Princess is usually considered to be next in line as Honored Queen. Girls who finish a term as Honored Queen use the title Past Honored Queen (abbreviated PHQ) within Job's Daughters, and usually receive a pin commemorating their service. The elected officers are referred to as the "line officers", or in some Bethels the "Elect Five" or "Top Five", of the Bethel, meaning that in general, a Daughter is elected sequentially from the lowest position (Marshal) to the highest position (Honored Queen).

Stations (Offices) of the Bethel and their respective duties
Elected:
 Honored Queen – leads meetings, events, etc. 
 Senior Princess – assists the Honored Queen in her duties. 
 Junior Princess – assists the Honored Queen in her duties. 
 Guide – escorts distinguished visitors and conducts new members through initiation.
 Marshal – assists the Guide in her duties, in charge of paraphernalia and escorts National Emblem during meetings.
*typically, one gets elected Marshal and will work her way up to Honored Queen in the above order. Note that in rare occurrences this may not be the case. Any eligible daughter can be voted into any elected station.

Appointed:
 Senior Custodian – assists the Marshal with paraphernalia
 Junior Custodian – assists the Marshal with paraphernalia
 Recorder – record notes during meetings
 Librarian – gives a report on literature, the arts, and/or sciences
 Chaplain – leads prayers during meetings.
 Treasurer – receive bethel funds.
 First Messenger – assists Princesses during initiations
 Second Messenger – assists Princesses during initiations
 Third Messenger – assists Princesses during initiations
 Fourth Messenger – assists Princesses during initiations
 Fifth Messenger – assists the Honored Queen during initiations
 Inner Guard – responds to Outer Guard's warnings from outside
 Outer Guard – prevents interruptions during meetings.
 Musician – leads songs and music, usually plays organ or piano
 Bethel Choir – no specific responsibility, can consist of unlimited number of girls, purely sings Bethel songs during meetings.

Bethel Guardian Council 

Bethel Guardian – in charge of monitoring the girls and granting permission for events * **
Associate Bethel Guardian – assists the Bethel Guardian * ***
Guardian Secretary – assists the Bethel Recorder and manages important documents *
Guardian Treasurer – manages the money, assists the Bethel Treasurer*
Guardian Director of Epochs – assists the girls in learning their ritual/memorization work *
Director of Music – assists the Bethel Musician in playing music during the meetings; can take the place of musician if there isn't one installed *
Director of Promotion – helps to promote the Bethel and Job's Daughters to increase membership
Promoter of Finance – assists the Guardian Treasurer
Promoter of Sociability – assists the Director of Promotion
Director of Hospitality – promotes good will between the Bethel and the community, other youth orders (DeMolay, IORG, etc.), and other Bethels

Promoter of Fraternal Relations – creates a bridge between a Bethel and their local Masonic sponsors/lodge
Custodian of Paraphernalia – assists the Marshal and Custodians in setting up the lodge room and taking care of the paraphernalia
Chairman of Youth Protection – promotes a safe environment within and outside the bethel 
*Executive council members; one must be present at each Bethel meeting

**Must be related to a Master Mason, Majority member, or Direct Relative of an active daughter

***Must be a Master Mason

Note that not all of these offices have to be filled; it's even possible to not have a Bethel Guardian, Associate Bethel Guardian, or both!

Degree of Royal Purple

The Degree of Royal Purple is awarded as the highest honor in recognition of outstanding, continuous and dedicated service of a Majority Member to the International Order of Job's Daughters. It is intended to recognize a Majority Member who has given to the Order in the capacity above and beyond the call of duty.

Famous Job's Daughters
Notable former Job's Daughters include Kim Cattrall, Jacquelynne Fontaine, Nancy Fleming, Jenilee Harrison, Nannette Hegerty, Vicki Lawrence, Heather Moore, Jean Rabe, Debbie Reynolds, and Aimee Teegarden.

References

External links
Job's Daughters International Home Page
The HIKE Fund  Hearing Improvement Kids Endowment, created and supported by Job's Daughters

Youth organizations established in 1920
Masonic youth organizations
Women's masonic organizations